Lubutu is a territory in Maniema province of the Democratic Republic of the Congo. Its current governor is Eri Hafizo. The territory contains the southern portion of Maiko National Park. It is bordered to the north and west by Tshopo Province, to the east by North Kivu, and it is bordered to the south by Punia Territory, separated by the Lowa river. The main roads in the territory are the N3 and N31 highways, which intersect at the town of Lubutu. South of the village of Tingi-Tingi, a widened section of the N3 serves as the Tingi-Tingi Airport.

As of the 2018 election, it is divided into two sectors, and 26 groupings:

 Lubutu Territory
Bitule Sector
Babongena Grouping
Babute Grouping
Babutukani Grouping
Bamugu I Grouping
Banango Grouping
Bbatikamwanga Grouping
Batike Grouping
Lubilinga Grouping
Mandimba Grouping
Okoku Grouping
Osele Grouping
Twabinga Grouping
Obokote Sector
Babogombe I Grouping
Babogombe II Grouping
Babokote Grouping
Babondjele Grouping
Babundji Grouping
Babusoko Grouping
Bamandea Grouping
Banali Grouping
Banenu Grouping
Kalombenyama Grouping
Kayumba Grouping
Misingi Grouping
Mukwanyama Grouping
Musafiri Grouping

References 

Territories of Maniema Province